A list of films produced in the Soviet Union in 1937 (see 1937 in film).

1937

See also
1937 in the Soviet Union

External links
 Soviet films of 1937 at the Internet Movie Database

1937
Soviet
Films